MMB may refer to:

Music
 Michigan Marching Band, of the University of Michigan
 The Mighty Mighty Bosstones, a band from Boston

Computing, science, and technology
 MMB (cipher), a block cipher in cryptography
 3-Mercapto-3-methylbutan-1-ol, a chemical found in some wines
 Minimal metabolic behaviors, for modeling metabolic networks
 Middle mouse button, a button on the computer mouse

Other uses
 Maharashtra Maritime Board
 Maritime Museum of Barcelona
 Memanbetsu Airport, an airport at Hokkaidō, Japan (IATA airport code: MMB)
 Milk Marketing Board, a former British government quango